Ian Macpherson Kerr  is a scientist whose research interests include the mechanism of action of the interferons, signal transduction and protein synthesis to viral infection and double-stranded RNA.

References

Fellows of the Royal Society
Fellows of the Academy of Medical Sciences (United Kingdom)
Living people
Year of birth missing (living people)